Leslie Rupert Hart (28 December 1909 – 7 January 2002) was a politician in South Australia.

He was the elder son of Edith R. Hart (née Lashmar) and Rupert Rufus Hart, sheep breeder of "Glen Devon", Two Wells. He studied woolclassing at the School of Mines. and with a brother went into partnership with their father as R. R. Hart and Sons, who like fellow parliamentarian Maynard Boyd Dawkins, were successful breeders of Dorset Horn sheep.

He was elected a Liberal candidate to a Midland district seat in the Legislative Council in October 1962 and resigned in March 1973.

Personal
Hart married Lily Edith Poole of Torrensville on 11 October 1941. They had a son, Malcolm, in 1942. This was followed by a daughter Rosemary, and finally another son, Robert.

References 

Members of the South Australian Legislative Council
Australian pastoralists
Australian sheep breeders
1909 births
2002 deaths
Liberal and Country League politicians
20th-century Australian politicians